Czerniki  (German Czernikau) is a village in the administrative district of Gmina Stara Kiszewa, within Kościerzyna County, Pomeranian Voivodeship, in northern Poland.

German operatic bass Hermann Thomaschek (1824–1910) was born in the village

For details of the history of the region, see History of Pomerania.

Population of the Village Czerniki is 21 as of 2022.

References

Czerniki